Hisashi Okuyama (born 1941 in Japan) is a Japanese poet who has lived in France since the 1970s.

Works
 Olla cineraria, 1998
 Percussif|année, 1999
 L'autoportrait aux chardons, 2000
 Volute de chute, 2004
 Cambrure|année, 2005
 Arrache alu pour deux voix, 2006
 Bouteille blanche : pour deux voix, 2006
 Ce retardement pour voix seule, 2006
 L'hiver le 24 janvier 1743, 2008, Æncrages & Co
 Le Jardin des Fugues, 2008, éditions Mémoire Vivante
 Sept neiges pour une partita, 2010, éditions Mémoire Vivante

External links
 éditions Mémoire Vivante

1941 births
Living people
Japanese writers
Asian writers in French